Serhiy Anatoliyovych Buletsa (born 16 February 1999) is a Ukrainian professional football midfielder who plays for Zorya Luhansk on loan from Dynamo Kyiv.

Career
Born in Zakarpattia Oblast, Buletsa is a product of Uzhhorod and Kyiv football academies among which are RVUFK Kyiv and Dynamo Kyiv youth sportive schools.

He played for Dynamo in the Ukrainian Premier League Reserves (U-21 and U-19 competitions) and in April 2019 he was promoted to the senior squad team. Buletsa was listed for the away game with FC Mariupol in the Ukrainian Premier League on 13 April 2019 yet has not played a minute.

On 26 June 2019, Buletsa was loaned to SC Dnipro-1 for the 2019–20 season. On 31 July 2019, in his Ukrainian Premier League debut against FC Olimpik Donetsk, Buletsa scored after only two minutes. That goal was also the first ever Ukrainian Premier League goal for Dnipro-1. On 31 August 2020, his loan was prolonged for another season.

International career
Buletsa was part of the Ukraine national under-20 football team that won the 2019 FIFA U-20 World Cup. He played a key role in Ukraine's success, appearing in all 7 of his team's matches and scoring 3 goals. At the end of the tournament, Buletsa received the Silver Ball, awarded to the second best player of the tournament.

He made his Ukraine national football team debut on 8 September 2021 in a friendly against the Czech Republic, a 1–1 away draw.

Career statistics

Honours

International
Ukraine U20
 FIFA U-20 World Cup: 2019

Individual
 FIFA U-20 World Cup Silver Ball: 2019

References

External links 
 
 

1999 births
Living people
Ukrainian footballers
Piddubny Olympic College alumni
FC Dynamo Kyiv players
Ukrainian Premier League players
Association football defenders
Ukraine international footballers
Ukraine youth international footballers
Ukraine under-21 international footballers
SC Dnipro-1 players
FC Zorya Luhansk players
Sportspeople from Zakarpattia Oblast